Belle-Rivière or Belle Rivière may refer to:

Canada 
 Belle-Rivière, Quebec, unorganized territory, in Lac-Saint-Jean-Est, Saguenay–Lac-Saint-Jean
 Bois de Belle-Rivière Regional Park, in Mirabel, Laurentides, Quebec
 Domaine et manoir de Belle-Rivière, a heritage building in Mirabel, Laurentides, Quebec
 La Belle Rivière (Lac Saint-Jean), river in Belle-Rivière, Quebec
 Lac de la Belle Rivière, lake in Belle-Rivière, Quebec

See also
Belle River (disambiguation)
Belle Rive (disambiguation)